Aappilattuinnakassak is a cape of the Anarusuk Island in the Upernavik Archipelago, Greenland. 
The cape is in the southern part of the island in the near of Qaqaarissorsuaq Island.

Anarusuk
Tasiusaq Bay